Sitora Farmonova is an Uzbek film actress, singer, and comedian. She rose to prominence within the Uzbek film industry with her roles in several Uzbek comedy films, such as Xavfli burilish (A Dangerous Turn) (2004), Mening akam boʻydoq! (My Brother is a Bachelor!) (2011), and Endi dadam boʻydoq? (Now My Father is a Bachelor?) (2013). Farmonova is also known for starring in the 2011 film Baikonur directed by Veit Helmer. She is the first Uzbek actress to star in a movie produced by a German filmmaker.

Farmonova has also launched a successful singing career. She achieved notability in Uzbekistan with her debut single "Bahor-kuz" ("Spring-Fall"). The song received positive reviews from both fans and critics upon its release.

Since 2015 Farmonova has been participating in KVN, a Russian humor TV show and competition, as a member of the Bishkek-based team  (Asia MIX). In July 2016, Farmonova faced criticism for "making fun of the Uzbek people" during one of the episodes of the show.

Life
Sitora Farmonova was born on 20 August 1984, in Bukhara. Her family moved to Tashkent when she was 13. She has two siblings, a younger brother and a younger sister.

Career 
A graduate of Uzbekistan State Institute of Arts and Culture, Sitora Farmonova has appeared in several films by Uzbek, Kazakh, and Kyrgyz filmmakers. She rose to prominence within the Uzbek film industry with her roles in several popular Uzbek comedy films, such as Xavfli burilish (A Dangerous Turn) (2004), Mening akam boʻydoq! (My Brother is a Bachelor!) (2011), and Endi dadam boʻydoq? (Now My Father is a Bachelor?) (2013).

Farmonova achieved some international recognition after acting in the 2011 film Baikonur directed by Veit Helmer. She is the first Uzbek actress to star in a movie produced by a German filmmaker. In Baikonur, Farmonova portrays Nazira, a resident of a small village near the Baikonur space station in Kazakhstan who falls in love with the main character Iskandar, a young Kazakh ham radio operator and space fanatic calling himself Gagarin after the Soviet cosmonaut.

Farmonova also appeared in the 2013 TV series Общага (The Dorm) that was shot in Kyrgyzstan. The series received positive reviews and Farmonova gained notability in Kyrgyzstan.

Farmonova has also launched a successful singing career. She achieved notability in Uzbekistan with her debut single "Bahor-kuz" ("Spring-Fall"), a duet with the Uzbek singer Mirjamol. The song received positive reviews from both fans and critics upon its release. Her duet song with the Kyrgyz singer Mirbek Atabekov "Эки журок/Ikki yurak" ("Two Hearts") was among the songs included in the soundtrack for the TV series Общага (The Dorm).

Since 2015 Farmonova has been participating in KVN, a Russian humor TV show and competition, as a member of the Bishkek-based team Азия MIX (Asia MIX). Азия MIX is an international team with members from Kazakhstan, Kyrgyzstan, Tajikistan, and Uzbekistan.

2016 controversy 
In July 2016, Farmonova faced criticism for "making fun of the Uzbek people" during one of the episodes of the show. This led to the suspension of Farmonova's license by Uzbeknavo, Uzbekistan's government agency that issues licenses to performers.

Discography

Music videos

Filmography

References

External links

 

[Buluteka]

21st-century Uzbekistani actresses
1984 births
Uzbeks
Living people
People from Bukhara
Uzbekistani film actresses
21st-century Uzbekistani women singers
KVN